The Rock 'N' Roll Rumble Tour was a concert tour by American hard rock band Aerosmith. The tour sent the band to 9 locations across Latin America from late September to October 2016, preceded by a one-off festival performance in San Diego on September 17. The band performed at a mix of large outdoor festivals, stadiums, and arenas.

Tour dates

Cancelled dates

Notes

Personnel
Aerosmith
Steven Tyler – lead vocals, harmonica, percussion
Joe Perry – guitar, backing vocals, lap pedal steel, talkbox, lead vocals on "Stop Messin' Around"
Brad Whitford – guitar
Tom Hamilton – bass, additional vocals on Dude Looks Like A Lady
Joey Kramer – drums, percussion
Additional musicians
Buck Johnson – keyboards, backing vocals

References

2016 concert tours
Aerosmith concert tours